Makoto Tamamura (玉村 誠, Tamamura Makoto) is an automobile chassis engineer. While working for Honda Motor Co. Ltd, Tamamura helped to design the Acura NSX and to tune the suspension of the Acura TL A-SPEC.

References
 "2004 Acura TL A-SPEC: No assembly required to enjoy this factory-spec tuner package", an article by John Kiewicz on page 136 of the March, 2004 issue of Motor Trend

Tamamura
Living people
Year of birth missing (living people)
Place of birth missing (living people)